Biglar or Beyglar may refer to:

Biglar, Qazvin
Biglar, Razavi Khorasan
Biglar, West Azerbaijan